Rhamu is a town in the Mandera County of Kenya and is the second largest town of the district. It sits across the Dawa River from the town of Sathe in Ethiopia. It is largely populated by the Garre Somali. The town was built by the Quranyow-Banna section of the Garre tribe. Rhamu is located at the international border between Kenya and Ethiopia.

Location
The coordinates of the town are:3°56'15.0"N, 41°13'13.0"E (Latitude:3.937499; Longitude:41.220277).

Overview

In 1977, the town was the location of what became known as the Rhamu Incident. More recently, in 2014, ethnic conflict erupted between the Degodia and Garre, with some of the combatants coming from neighbouring Ethiopia, across the Dawa River. At least twenty people died in that conflict, with an estimated 13,000 internally displaced from their homes.

The Elwak–Mandera Road passes through the middle of town. Rhamu is serviced by Rhamu Airport.

Population
In September 2014, the Kenya Red Cross estimated the population of the Rhamu at about 40,000.

See also
 List of roads in Kenya

References

Populated places in Mandera County
Ethiopia–Kenya border crossings